Zhang Delin (born August 1939) is a Chinese politician who served as party secretary of Chongqing from 1995 to 1999. He was a member of the 15th and 16th Central Committee of the Chinese Communist Party. He was a member of the Standing Committee of the 10th Chinese People's Political Consultative Conference.

Biography
Zhang was born in Beijing, in August 1939. He joined the Chinese Communist Party (CCP) in June 1964. In 1958, he entered Tsinghua University, majoring in the Mechanical Department. After University in 1964, he taught at Beijing Institute of Machinery.

In 1965, he joined the faculty of Gansu University of Technology (now Lanzhou University of Technology). He moved up the ranks to become vice president in October 1980 and president in June 1983.

In October 1985, he became party secretary of Harbin Boiler Plant. He was elevated to executive deputy secretary of Harbin in June 1987, and was chosen as mayor in February 1990.

He was appointed party secretary of Chongqing in October 1995 and was admitted to member of the Standing Committee of the CCP Sichuan Provincial Committee, the province's top authority. When Chongqing was upgraded to a direct-controlled municipality in June 1997, his position at provincial-ministerial level.

References

1939 births
Living people
Tsinghua University alumni
Academic staff of Lanzhou University of Technology
Presidents of Lanzhou University of Technology
Mayors of Harbin
People's Republic of China politicians from Beijing
Chinese Communist Party politicians from Beijing
Members of the 15th Central Committee of the Chinese Communist Party
Members of the 16th Central Committee of the Chinese Communist Party
Members of the Standing Committee of the 10th Chinese People's Political Consultative Conference